Madame Sphinx is a lost 1918 silent film mystery directed by Thomas N. Heffron and starring Alma Rubens. It was produced by the Triangle Film Corporation.

Cast
Alma Rubens - Celeste
Wallace MacDonald - Andre Du Bois
Eugene Burr - Raoul Laverne (*Gene Burr)
Frank MacQuarrie - Henri Du Bois
William Dyer - Guissert
Richard Rosson - Dessin
Betty Pearce - Lys
Wilbur Higby - Chambre
Arthur Millett - Beauchad
John Lince - Louis

References

External links
 Madame Sphinx at IMDb.com

1918 films
American silent feature films
Lost American films
Films directed by Thomas N. Heffron
Triangle Film Corporation films
American black-and-white films
American mystery films
1918 mystery films
1918 lost films
Lost mystery films
1910s American films
Silent mystery films